Eustroma melancholicum is a moth in the family Geometridae. It was described by Arthur Gardiner Butler in 1878. It is found in Asia, including Taiwan, Japan and the Russian Far East.

Subspecies
Eustroma melancholicum melancholicum
Eustroma melancholicum brunnearium Leech, 1897
Eustroma melancholicum interruptum (Wileman, 1911)
Eustroma melancholicum venulatum (Oberthür, 1880)
Eustroma melancholicum venipictum Warren, 1893

References

Moths described in 1878
Moths of Japan
Cidariini
Taxa named by Arthur Gardiner Butler